Micropentila mabangi, the Sierra Leone dots, is a butterfly in the family Lycaenidae. It is found in Sierra Leone and eastern Ivory Coast. The habitat consists of primary forests.

References

Butterflies described in 1904
Poritiinae